Frangelico is a brand of  (flavored with hazelnuts) and herb-flavored liqueur coloured with caramel coloring, which is produced in Canale, Italy. It is 20% alcohol by volume (ABV) or 40 proof. Formerly, it was 24% ABV or 48 proof. When produced by the Barbaro family it was bottled at 28% ABV or 56 proof.  The brand was created in 1978.  It is known for its unusual packaging; its bottle was designed to look like a Christian friar, complete with a knotted white cord around the waist.  It is most commonly sold in two sizes: 750ml and 375ml.

According to the manufacturer, the name of the liqueur is based on a legend of a hermit monk named Fra Angelico who lived in the Piedmont region of Italy and "created unique recipes for liqueurs".  The bottle itself most closely resembles the habit of a Franciscan friar.

Frangelico is made in a similar manner to some other nut liqueurs: nuts are crumbled up and combined with cocoa, vanilla berries, and other natural flavors, and then left to soak in the base spirit.  After the spirit has absorbed the flavor of the ingredients, the liqueur is filtered, sweetened, and bottled.

The brand was purchased by Gruppo Campari in 2010, having previously been owned by William Grant and C&C Group.

Ingredients
Frangelico contains sugar, alcohol, hazelnut distillate, natural and artificial flavours, and caramel.

A  serving of Frangelico contains about 11 g of sugar, making Frangelico approximately 40% sugar by weight.

Reviews
Frangelico has been submitted to at least three spirit ratings organizations.  The San Francisco World Spirits Competition, the Beverage Testing Institute, and Wine Enthusiast have generally awarded favorable reviews to the spirit. Proof66, which aggregates ratings information from the expert review bodies, categorizes Frangelico as a "Tier 1" spirit, which places it in its "Highly Recommended" category.

Appearances in media
The artist Jeff Koons reproduced two Frangelico advertisements, "Stay in Tonight" and "Find a Quiet Table", in his 1986 Luxury & Degradation series of paintings and sculptures based on the role of alcohol in culture. According to Koons he used the Frangelico ads to "defin[e] a $45,000 and up income", in contrast to other works in the series which correspond to lower income levels.

Frangelico was a featured brand on the AMC advertising reality show The Pitch in Season 1, Episode 6.

See also

 Amaretto

References

External links
 Official website

Italian liqueurs
Nut liqueurs
Campari Group